On the High Seas is a 1922 American silent adventure film directed by Irvin Willat and written by Edward Sheldon and E. Magnus Ingleton. The film stars Dorothy Dalton, Jack Holt, Mitchell Lewis, Winter Hall, Michael Dark, Otto Brower, and William Boyd. The film was released on September 17, 1922, by Paramount Pictures.

Plot
As described in a film magazine review, while returning from East Asia, the ship S.S. Andren catches fire. Leone Deveraux is rescued by stokers Jim Dorn and Joe Polack, and the three cast off in a small boat. After three days, they sight a plague ship derelict, throw the corpses overboard, and make themselves at home. Joe desires Leone and one night during a storm attacks her, but she is rescued by Jim with whom she has fallen in love. Joe is then killed by a falling mast. The two lovers are rescued by a battleship and taken home. Leone, who is engaged to be married, loses trace of Jim until, on a day when she is on the way to the church, she is abducted by a masked man who turns out to be Jim. When it is revealed that Jim is actually a man of position and wealth, the two begin a happy relationship.

Cast

Preservation
With no prints of On the High Seas located in any film archives, it is a lost film.

References

External links 

 
 

1922 films
American adventure films
1922 adventure films
Paramount Pictures films
Films directed by Irvin Willat
American black-and-white films
American silent feature films
Lost American films
1922 lost films
Lost adventure films
1920s English-language films
1920s American films
Silent adventure films